"Can't Fake the Feeling" is 1980 disco single written by Geraldine Hunt and Kathleen Dyson  It was performed by Geraldine Hunt and is a track from her album, No Way.

Chart performance
The single hit number one on the dance chart in the United States for seven weeks and peaked at number 58 on the soul singles chart. In the UK Singles Chart, "Can't Fake the Feeling" peaked at number 44.

References

1980 songs
1980 singles
Disco songs